John Scott MM (born  1889) was a Scottish footballer whose regular position was wing half. Born in Wishaw or Motherwell, he played for Hamilton Academical, Bradford Park Avenue, Manchester United and St Mirren. Scott was awarded a Military Medal during the First World War.

References 

Year of birth missing
1880s births
Year of death missing
20th-century deaths
Scottish footballers
Bradford (Park Avenue) A.F.C. players
Manchester United F.C. players
St Mirren F.C. players
Cambuslang Rangers F.C. players
Hamilton Academical F.C. players
Hamilton Academical F.C. wartime guest players
Association football wing halves
Footballers from Motherwell
Scottish Junior Football Association players
Scottish Football League players
Recipients of the Military Medal
British military personnel of World War I